Love Island is a 2014 film directed by Jasmila Žbanić.

Cast
Ariane Labed - Liliane
Ermin Bravo - Grebo
Ada Condeescu - Flora
Franco Nero - Marquis Polesini
Leon Lučev - Stipica
Branka Petrić - Madame Henzl

Reception
Stephen Dalton gave a negative review in The Hollywood Reporter: "Love Island is not a subtle movie. The dialogue, written and spoken by people for whom English is plainly a second or third language, is full of corny lines and clunky twists. The camera work also feels oddly jittery, with lots of sudden crash zooms that would make more sense in a mockumentary than in this kind of sweet comic trifle. The characters are cartoons, their romantic crisis deeply implausible and their final reconciliation risibly silly."

References

External links

Croatian romantic comedy films
Films directed by Jasmila Žbanić
Films set on islands
Films shot in Croatia